Piotr Bujnarowski (born 4 July 1972) is a Polish rower. He competed at the 1992 Summer Olympics and the 1996 Summer Olympics.

References

1972 births
Living people
Polish male rowers
Olympic rowers of Poland
Rowers at the 1992 Summer Olympics
Rowers at the 1996 Summer Olympics
Sportspeople from Toruń